Yumiko Fujita (藤田 弓子; born 12 September 1945 in Meguro, Tokyo, Japan) is a Japanese actress.

Selected filmography

Film
 If You Were Young: Rage (1970)
 Under the Flag of the Rising Sun (1972)
 Karafuto 1945 Summer Hyosetsu no Mon (1974)
 The Bullet Train (1975)
 Muddy River (1981)
 Time and Tide (1984)
 Seburi monogatari (1985)
 Chizuko's Younger Sister (1991)
 Lonely Heart (1985)
 Drugstore Girl (2003)
 Glory to the Filmmaker! (2007)
 Golden Orchestra (2016)
 What Happened to Our Nest Egg!? (2021)
 Do Unto Others (2023)

Television
 Ghost Soup (1992)

References

External links 
 Official Site 
 
 Profile at JMDb 

Asadora lead actors
1945 births
People from Meguro
Living people
Actresses from Tokyo